Frost's arboreal alligator lizard (Abronia frosti) is a species of lizard endemic to Central America.

Etymology
The specific name, frosti, is in honor of American herpetologist Darrell R. Frost.

Geographic range
A. frosti is found in one isolated location in Guatemala, in the Huehuetenango Department.

References

Further reading
Campbell JA, Sasa M, Acevedo M, Mendelson JR III. 1998. A new species of Abronia (Squamata: Anguidae) from the High Chuchumatanes of Guatemala. Herpetologica 54 (2): 221–234. (Abronia frosti, new species).

Abronia
Endemic fauna of Guatemala
Reptiles of Guatemala
Reptiles described in 1998
Taxa named by Jonathan A. Campbell
Taxa named by Manuel Acevedo (herpetologist)